This list identifies the military aircraft which are currently being operated, or have formerly been operated, by the Malaysian Armed Forces.

Current aircraft

Malaysian Army

Royal Malaysian Navy

Royal Malaysian Air Force

Retired aircraft

See also
 List of equipment of the Malaysian Army
 List of equipment of the Royal Malaysian Navy
 List of equipment of the Royal Malaysian Air Force
 List of equipment of the Malaysian Maritime Enforcement Agency
 List of vehicles of the Royal Malaysian Police
 List of police firearms in Malaysia

References

Bibliography
 Capper, N. J. "Prestwick's STOL Pioneer". Air Enthusiast, No. 10, July–September 1979, pp. 22–25.

External links

 Royal Malaysian Air Force overview
 First pic of Malaysias new SU30MKM

Malaysian Armed Forces
Malaysia transport-related lists
Malaysian military aircraft
Royal Malaysian Air Force